Hamish Kerr (born 17 August 1996 in Dunedin) is a New Zealand high jumper. He won the gold medal at the 2022 Commonwealth Games and bronze at the 2022 World Indoor Championships. Kerr is the Oceanian indoor record holder in the high jump and holds the New Zealand outdoor record.

Career
In June 2019, Kerr equalled the national record with a jump of 2.30 m, winning the gold medal at the Oceania Athletics Championships in Townsville. He went on to compete at the Universiade in Naples, Italy in July and then the World Athletics Championships in October in Doha, Qatar.

In February 2021, he improved the national record with 2.31 m at the Newtown Park Stadium, Wellington. Later the same year at the postponed 2020 Tokyo Olympics, he finished 10th in the men's high jump final with a clearance of 2.30 m.

Kerr competed at the 2022 World Indoor Championships in Belgrade, Serbia in March, where he surpassed the 39-year-old New Zealand indoor record of Roger Te Puni (of 2.16 m) with a bronze medal-winning jump of 2.31 m (tied with Gianmarco Tamberi). He won the Oceania Athletics Championships in June that year, jumping 2.24 m. In August, he claimed the gold medal at the Commonwealth Games held in Birmingham with a jump of 2.25 m.

In February 2023 at the Banskobystricka latka in Banská Bystrica, Slovakia, Kerr broke Tim Forsyth's Oceanian indoor record dating back to 1997 with a clearance of 2.34 m, an outright lifetime best.

Personal bests
 High jump –  (Wellington 2021) 
 High jump indoor –  (Banská Bystrica 2023) Oceanian record

References

External links
 
 NZ rankings
 
 
 

1996 births
Living people
New Zealand male high jumpers
Competitors at the 2019 Summer Universiade
Olympic athletes of New Zealand
Athletes (track and field) at the 2020 Summer Olympics
Athletes (track and field) at the 2022 Commonwealth Games
Commonwealth Games gold medallists for New Zealand
Commonwealth Games gold medallists in athletics
World Athletics Indoor Championships medalists
Sportspeople from Dunedin
Medallists at the 2022 Commonwealth Games